Olivier Mahafaly Solonandrasana (born 21 June 1964, Nosy Be, Madagascar) is a Madagascar politician who was Prime Minister of Madagascar from 2016 to 2018. He succeeded Jean Ravelonarivo. Until his appointment as Prime Minister he was Minister of Interior.

On 4 June 2018, he announced his resignation.

References

1964 births
Government ministers of Madagascar
Living people
People from Nosy Be
Prime Ministers of Madagascar